Martinganj is a Nagar panchayat located in the Azamgarh District of Uttar Pradesh, India. Its coordinates are 25.910 latitude and 82.809 longitude. The other surrounding state capitals are Patna , Ranchi , and Gangtok .

History
Martingan was settled during the British Raj. The town was established as a tehsil in 2012 under the [[SHIVAM SAROJ 
ministry]]. In October 2020, it was proposed to make Martinganj a nagar panchayat by the Yogi Adityanath ministry.

Languages
The official language is Hindi, and additional official is Urdu.

Religious festivals
Hindu Festival like Navratri, Vijayadashami Mela and Ramlila are celebrated. The primary Muslim festivals celebrated annually in the village are the ld-ul-fitr', (Ramadan), Bakrid, Mid-Sha'ban, Bara Wafat and Muharram.

Politics
In the 2019 general elections Sangeeta Azad of the Bahujan samajwadi Party became the Member of Parliament from the Lalganj constituency. In the Uttar Pradesh Legislative Assembly Election of 2017 Sukhdev Rajbhar of the Bahujan Samaj Party became the Member of Legislative Assembly from Didarganj (Assembly constituency). The Samajwadi Party, the Bahujan Samaj Party, and the Bharatiya Janata Party are the major political parties in this area.

Nearest airport
 Azamgarh Airport	                                        40.8 km.
 Lal Bahadur Shastri International Airport (Babatpur)	47.9 km.
 Akbarpur Airport	                                        60.9 km.

Local media
Mostly all major English, Hindi and Urdu daily newspapers, including The Times of India, Hindustan Times, The Hindu, Dainik Jagran, Amar Ujala and Hindustan, are available in Martinganj. Almost all big Hindi TV news channels have stringers in Azamgarh.

Communication networks
All prominent telecommunication network provider in India offer their services in Martinganj.

Radio services
All radio services available in Martinganj.

 Voice Of Azamgarh 90.4 MHz Community Radio.
 Air Vivid Bharti 102.2 MHz which Broadcast from Mau District & Covers Azamgarh city too.

See also
 Martinganj, 
 Azamgarh
 Badon

References

Villages in Azamgarh district